Preco Electronics Inc is a multinational vendor of radar-based object detection systems headquartered in Boise, Idaho, United States.

Preco was founded in 1947 by Edwin R. Peterson as a rebuilder of electronic water pumps, generators, and batteries and introduced the first reverse-motion alarm in 1967.

Current products 
PreView is a solid-state, pulsed-radar object detect system engineered to alert vehicle operators of both moving and stationary obstacles. The system can also be combined with automatic braking systems to stop vehicles when an obstacle is near. PreView is designed to work in extreme environmental conditions.

Industry associations 
National Waste & Recycling Association 
Technology and Maintenance Council (American Trucking Associations) 
SWANA (Solid Waste Association of North America)
National Association of Fleet Administrators
Executive member of Association of Building Contractors 
SME (Society for Mining, Metallurgy and Exploration)

References

External links 
http://www.electronicstalk.com/news/rfi/rfi141.html
http://www.icuee.com/Documents/VTS/Brochure/pWMGXu5fsY/CSIdaho.pdf
http://aggminmarketplace.com/results.php?search_type=keyword&si=sme&wS=1&v=2.2&term=preco+electronics&btnSubmitSearchMarketplace.x=0&btnSubmitSearchMarketplace.y=0
 http://patft.uspto.gov/netacgi/nph-Parser?Sect1=PTO1&Sect2=HITOFF&d=PALL&p=1&u=%2Fnetahtml%2FPTO%2Fsrchnum.htm&r=1&f=G&l=50&s1=3629819.PN.&OS=PN/3629819&RS=PN/3629819

Companies based in Idaho
1947 establishments in Idaho